The Armenian Economic Association (ArmEA or AEA) is a professional association that promotes Armenian scholarship in economics. It was formed in 2006 and is a registered NGO in Armenia. Gurgen Aslanyan is its current president. The association works to further economics research in Armenia, to improve economics education within Armenian institutions, to support research-based policy advising, and to develop the interest of research economists to Armenia related issues.

The association's flagship activity is the annual conference in Armenia every June. Keynote addresses in various years have been delivered by Daron Acemoglu, Tito Boeri,  Ruben Enikolopov, Randall K. Filer, Sergei Guriev among others.

The society is led by a Board of Directors that is responsible for developing and executing the association's policies and activities.

History and purpose 
The association was formed in 2006 by David Joulfaian and Shushanik Hakobyan. It was registered as an NGO in 2012 by Zareh Asatryan, the president of the association at the time.  
The aims of the Armenian Economic Association are:

1. to contribute to the development of economics education 
2. to encourage the research and study of economic activity 
3. to develop and promote cooperation among academic, private, and public sector researchers 
4. to develop and promote cooperation with international scholars and educators, and educational and research institutions 
5. to provide a platform for the free and open discussion of economic and public policy issues

Presidents 
2018-present: Gurgen Aslanyan 
2014-2018: Aleksandr Grigoryan 
2012-2014: Zareh Asatryan 
2006-2012: Shushanik Haobyan

Conferences and workshops

Annual meetings 
Annual meetings are typically held at the end of June, except for the years 2011-2013 when they were held in October. Past meetings were hosted by: 

2022 Online (June 30), in-person American University of Armenia (July 1-2) 
2021 Online 
2020 Online 
2019 Armenian National Agrarian University, Armenian State University of Economics, and American University of Armenia 
2018 Tumo Center for Creative Technologies and American University of Armenia 
2017 Yerevan State University and the American University of Armenia 
2016 Yerevan State University, International Center for Agribusiness Research and Education, and American University of Armenia 
2015 Yerevan State University, Central Bank of Armenia - Dilijan Center, and American University of Armenia 
2014 Yerevan State University, Russian-Armenian University, and American University of Armenia 
2013 Yerevan State University and American University of Armenia  
2012 Yerevan State University 
2011 Yerevan State University

Armen Alchian best paper award recipients  

The following are the recipients of the Armen Alchian award for the best paper presented at the annual meetings: 

Hayk Hambardzumyan (2022) 
Corina Boar and Virgiliu Midrigan (2021)  
Vladimir Asriyan (2020) 
Armenak Antinyan (2019) 
Nikolaos Artavanis (2018) 
Tatevik Sekhposyan (2017) 
Arevik Gnutzmann-Mkrtchyan (2017) 
Gunes Gokmen (2016) 
Mariam Arzumanyan (2016) 
Suren Pakhchanyan (2016) 
Ivan Djuric (2016) 
Vardan Baghdasaryan (2015) 
Vardan Avagyan (2015) 
Artashes Karapetyan (2015) 
Aleksandr Grigoryan (2014) 
Nune Hovhannisyan (2014) 
Gurgen Aslanyan (2014)

Keynote speakers 
Keynote speakers at the annual meetings include: 

Paula Bustos (2022) 
Armen Nurbekyan (2022)  
Nico Voigtländer (2022) 
Sergei Guriev (2021) 
Lee E. Ohanian 2021 
Johanna Rickne 2021) 
Martin Galstyan (2020) 
Friedrich Heinemann (2019) 
Levon Barseghyan (2019) 
Francesca Molinari (2019) 
Daron Acemoglu (2018) 
Arye L. Hillman (2018) 
Yulia Ustyugova (2018) 
Xavier Raurich (2017) 
Randall Filer (2017) 
Laura Bailey (2016) 
Ruben Enikolopov (2016) 
Martin Galstyan (2015) 
David Dole (2015) 
Mattias Polborn (2014) 
Haroutioun Samuelian (2014) 
Teresa Daban Sanchez (2014) 
Daron Acemoglu (2013) 
Mark Davis (2013)

Keynote speakers at workshops 
Conference on Econometrics and Business Analytics (2022) 
Giuseppe Cavaliere
Esfandiar Maasoumi

Alexey Onatsky

Jean-Michel Zakoian

Asset Management and Pension Economics student workshop (2020) 
Tito Boeri

Winter Workshop 

The Winter Workshop was inaugurated in 2019. Past workshops were hosted by: 

2021 Online 
2020 American University of Armenia 
2019 American University of Armenia

Women in Economics Workshop 

The Women in Economics Workshop (WEW) was inaugurated in 2019. Past workshops were hosted by: 

2022 Online 
2021 Online 
2019 American University of Armenia

See also 

 Economy of Armenia
 Education in Armenia

References

External links 
 

Economics societies
Business and finance professional associations
Economy of Armenia
Non-profit organizations based in Europe
Organizations established in 2006